Luiz Ejlli (born 12 July 1985) is an Albanian singer, musician, cooking chef, jurist, ex diplomat, reality show star and TV personality.
He is also known for starring on Big Brother VIP (Albanian season 2) on Top Channel. In 2010 Ejlli was appointed by the Albanian Government as First Secretary for Culture, Tourism and Arts in the Albanian Embassy in Paris, France.

Life and career 

Luiz Ejlli was born in Shkodër, Albania. Between 1991 and 2002, he attended the Prenk Jakova Musical secondary (high) school in Shkodër. Ejlli debuted in an Albanian version of Idol in Tirana called [["Ethet e së premtes mbrëma" ("The fevers of friday night"). He ended in second place with the song "Hëna dhe Yjet Dashurojnë". Luiz participated in the Eurovision Song Contest selection once again in 2005 and won with the song "Zjarr e Ftohtë" (Fire and Cold), which represented Albania at the Eurovision Song Contest 2006, but failed to make it past the semi-final stage of ECS. In November 2010 Luiz Ejlli together with Juliana Pasha in a duet participated in another famous annual musical competition in Albania, Kënga Magjike Festival ("Magical Song") an exclusivity of Televizioni Klan (TV Klan) with the song "Sa e shite zemrën" ("How much did you sell your heart for"), winning the award of the critic and the first place award. Luiz Ejlli was employed from the Albanian state authorities of the Ministry of Foreign affairs as a cultural attaché at the Albanian embassy in Paris.
Since December 24, 2022, Luiz is a contestant in the second season of the Albanian version of Big Brother VIP.

References 

1985 births
Living people
Musicians from Shkodër
21st-century Albanian male singers
Festivali i Këngës winners
Eurovision Song Contest entrants for Albania
Eurovision Song Contest entrants of 2006
Cultural attachés